The 2007–08 Venezuelan Professional Baseball League season.

For the first time in a regular season, Leones, Zulia and Magallanes were eliminated making the first time a Venezuelan Caribbean Series Champion didn't make the postseason. On the other hand, Bravos de Margarita earned a trip to the playoffs after moving from Araure. Omar Vizquel played their last season with the Leones del Caracas.

LVBP

Round robin

Despite having the best record in the regular season, Caribes didn't make to the final series.

Championship series

Tigres won in 6 disputed games the 2007-08 championship.

LVBP seasons